Sarnoff is a surname. 

Sarnoff may also refer to:

Sarnoff A. Mednick (1928–2015), researcher in the causes of psychopathology or mental disorders, Professor Emeritus of the University of Southern California
Sarnoff Fellowship, for medical students interested in cardiovascular research
Sarnoff Corporation, the former RCA labs
Sarnoff Mountains, Marie Byrd Land, Antarctica